Xavier Marmier (22 June 180812 October 1892) was a French author born in Pontarlier, in Doubs. He had a passion for travelling, and this he combined throughout his life with the production of literature. After journeying in Switzerland, Belgium and the Netherlands, he was attached in 1835 to the Arctic expedition of the Recherche; and after a couple of years at Rennes as professor of foreign literature, he visited (1842) Russia, (1845) Syria, (1846) Algeria, (1848–1849) North America and South America, and numerous volumes from his pen were the result.

In 1870 he was elected to the Academy (Seat 31), and he was for many years prominently identified with the Sainte-Geneviève library. He did much to encourage the study of Scandinavian literature in France, publishing translations of Holberg, Oehlenschlager and others. He died in Paris in 1892.

Works

 1833: Pierre, ou les suites de l'ignorance
 1833-1837: Choix de paraboles de Krummacher, 2 vol.
 1837: Lettres sur l'Islande 1838: Langue et littérature islandaises. Histoire de l'Islande depuis sa découverte jusqu'à nos jours 1839: Histoire de la littérature en Danemark et en Suède  1840: Lettres sur le Nord, 2 vol.
 1841: Souvenirs de voyages et traditions populaires 1842: Chants populaires du Nord. Lettres sur la Hollande 1844: Poésies d'un voyageur. Relation des voyages de la commission scientifique du Nord, 2 vol.
 1845: Nouveaux souvenirs de voyages en Franche-Comté 1847: Du Rhin au Nil, 2 vol. Lettres sur l'Algérie 1848: Lettres sur la Russie, la Finlande et la Pologne, 2 vol.
 1851: Les Âmes en peine, contes d'un voyageur. Lettres sur l'Amérique, 2 vol.
 1852: Les Voyageurs nouveaux, 3 vol.
 1854: Lettres sur l'Adriatique et le Monténégro, 2 vol. Les perce-neige. Du Danube au Caucase
 1856: Un été au bord de la Baltique. Au bord de la Néva 1857: Les quatre âges. Les drames intimes, contes russes
 1858: Les fiancés de Spitzberg. La forêt noire 1858–1859: Voyage pittoresque en Allemagne, 2 vol.
 1859: En Amérique et en Europe 1860: Gazida. Histoires allemandes et scandinaves 1861: Voyage en Suisse 1862: Hélène et Suzanne. Voyages et littérature 1863: En Alsace : l'avare et son trésor 1864: En chemin de fer. Nouvelles de l'Est et de l'Ouest. Les mémoires d'un orphelin. Le roman d'un héritier 1866: Histoire d'un pauvre musicien 1867: De l'Est à l'Ouest, voyages et littérature  1868: Les Drames du cœur. Les Hasards, contes de la vie 1873: Impressions et souvenirs d'un voyageur chrétien. Robert Bruce : comment on reconquiert un royaume 1874: Les États-Unis et le Canada. Récits américains. Trois jours de la vie d'une reine 1876: La vie dans la maison. En pays lointains  1879: Nouveaux récits de voyages 1880: Antonia 1882: Légendes des plantes et des oiseaux  1883: À la maison. Études et souvenirs 1884: En Franche-Comté. Le succès par la persévérance 1885: Passé et présent. Récits de voyage 1889: À travers les tropiques  1890: Au Sud et au Nord. Prose et vers''

References

External links
 
 

1809 births
1892 deaths
People from Pontarlier
French travel writers
French information and reference writers
19th-century French writers
Members of the Académie Française
French male non-fiction writers
19th-century French male writers